Boomerang Europe refers to one of the following feeds:
 Boomerang UK, which airs in the United Kingdom, Ireland and Malta in English.
 Boomerang CEE, which airs in Central and Eastern Europe, East-Central Europe, Benelux, The CIS/The Commonwealth Of Independent States/The CIS Countries, The Balkans/The Balkan Peninsula, Lithuania, & the Caucasus Countries, & regions both in, and/or inside, & outside of Caucasia in Dutch, English, German, Hungarian, Polish, Romanian, Russian,  Bulgarian, &  Czech.
 Boomerang MENA/Boomerang Africa, two separate feeds. The current feed airs across the Middle East and North Africa region (it excludes Israel, Iran and Turkey) in English and Arabic, with a Greek version also available on providers in Greece and Cyprus; the feed airs exclusively in Sub-Saharan Africa in English only (it excludes Hebrew, & many other languages of Israel, Persian, & many other languages of Iran, & Turkish, & many other languages of Turkey.).
 Boomerang Portugal, which airs in Portuguese and is aired in Portugal as well as Lusophone countries in Sub-Saharan Africa (i.e. Angola and Mozambique). 
 Boomerang Nordic, which airs in the Nordic countries, Denmark, Finland, Iceland, Norway, & Sweden in the Danish, Swedish, Norwegian, & English-languages.
 Boomerang Italy, which airs in Italy, Italian-speaking parts of Switzerland and San Marino in Italian.
 Boomerang France, which airs in France, Monaco, French-speaking parts of Switzerland and Belgium, and Francophone countries in Africa in French
 Boomerang Turkey, which airs in Turkey in Turkish.

Boomerang (TV network)
Children's television networks
Turner Broadcasting System Europe